Kyiv Christian Academy (KCA) is an international K-12 school started in 1993 for the purpose of educating missionary children in Kyiv, Ukraine. KCA has an enrollment of 150 children and its graduates are studying at state and private universities and colleges throughout North America and various parts of the world.

Approximately 65% of the students are from The United States of America. Other nationalities represented are Republic of Korea, Ukraine, The Netherlands, Republic of China (Taiwan), Mexico, and more.

KCA is founded upon Evangelical Christian values, and requires staff and families to adhere to its doctrinal statement and student handbook. The school uses American curricula and seeks to provide a supportive and academically challenging educational environment.

KCA athletes compete with other international schools in Kyiv, primarily Pechersk School International and Kyiv International School, as well as other specialized Ukrainian schools, like "Lyceum No. 100."

On February 25, 2005, the Association of Christian Schools International (ACSI) awarded accreditation to Kyiv Christian Academy.

References

Educational institutions established in 1993
Schools in Kyiv
International schools in Ukraine
Christian schools
1993 establishments in Ukraine